Ripley Hill straddles the divide between the Skaneateles Lake and Otisco Lake watersheds, it was once considered to be the highest point in Onondaga County, New York at 1,986 feet, but is now recognized to be slightly lower than the high point of Highland Forest (county park), Fellows Hill 2019 ft and Morgan Hill at 2060 ft.

Ripley Hill offers a sweeping panorama to the north and east.  Ripley Hill is near Spafford Forest, an Onondaga County preserve with hiking and dirt bike trails.  Ripley Hill is accessed by a public dirt road, seasonally maintained.  Adjoining property is privately owned and may be posted, especially during hunting season.

External links 
 Spafford Forest
 Spafford Forest Recreation Committee

References 

Landforms of Onondaga County, New York
Hills of New York (state)